A corporate accelerator is a specific form of seed accelerator which is sponsored by an established for-profit corporation. Similar to seed accelerators they support early-stage startup companies through mentorship and often capital and office space. In contrast to regular programs, though, corporate accelerators derive their objectives from the sponsoring organization. These objectives can include the wish to stay close to emerging trends or to establish a funnel for corporate venture capital investments.

According to Corporate Accelerator DB there are 70+ such programs in existence as of December 2016. Notable companies include Microsoft, Citrix, and Telefónica who were among the first companies to offer such programs in the early 2010s. More recently, corporate accelerators have faced criticism as they might be less effective as regular seed accelerators. For example, the startup could be too focused on solving the problems of the sponsoring firm rather than finding external customers.

Corporate accelerators differ from Business incubators, which usually have a continuous intake, due to their fixed-term, cohort-based organization (similar to seed accelerators) and are distinct to corporate venture capital which is a direct, targeted investment.

See also

 Business incubator
 Seed accelerator

References

Business incubators
Corporate development
Business terms
 Cor